Nimarata Nikki Haley (née Randhawa; born January 20, 1972) is an American politician who served as the 116th governor of South Carolina from 2011 to 2017. She was the 29th United States ambassador to the United Nations for two years, from January 2017 through December 2018.

Haley was born in Bamberg, South Carolina, and earned an accounting degree from Clemson University. She joined her family's clothing business before serving as treasurer and then president of the National Association of Women Business Owners. 

First elected to the South Carolina House of Representatives in 2004, she served three terms. In 2010, during her third term, she was elected governor of South Carolina, and won re-election in 2014. Haley was the first female governor of South Carolina, the youngest governor in the country and the second governor of Indian descent (after fellow Republican Bobby Jindal of Louisiana). She was the first female governor of Asian American heritage. In 2017, Haley became the first Indian American member of a presidential cabinet.

Haley served as United States ambassador to the United Nations from January 2017 through 2018, following confirmation by the U.S. Senate in a 96–4 vote, and upon taking the oath of office on January 27, 2017. 

Haley affirmed the United States's willingness to use military force in response to further North Korean missile tests in the wake of the 2017–2018 North Korea crisis. She defended U.S. interests, particularly U.S. support of Israel, at the Security Council, and led the withdrawal of the U.S. from the United Nations Human Rights Council. She decided to voluntarily step down as Ambassador on December 31, 2018.

Haley is a candidate in the 2024 Republican Party presidential primary for president of the United States in the 2024 U.S. presidential election. She announced her campaign in February 2023.

Early life and education
Haley was born Nimarata Nikki Randhawa on January 20, 1972, at Bamberg County Hospital in Bamberg, South Carolina, to immigrant Sikh parents from Punjab, India. Her father, Ajit Singh Randhawa, and her mother, Raj Kaur Randhawa, emigrated to the United States from Amritsar District, Punjab, India. Her father was formerly a professor at Punjab Agricultural University, and her mother received her law degree from the University of Delhi. Haley was known by her middle name, Nikki, a Punjabi name, from her earliest years.

Haley's parents moved to Canada after her father received a scholarship offer from the University of British Columbia. When her father received his PhD in 1969, he moved his family to South Carolina to be a professor at Voorhees College, a historically black institution.

Her mother, Raj Randhawa, earned a master's degree in education and taught for seven years in Bamberg public schools. In 1976 she started a popular clothing boutique, Exotica International. It closed in 2008.

Haley has a sister and two brothers. Her sister, Simran, born in Canada, became a radio host and Fashion Institute of Technology alumna. Her brother, Mitti, retired as a member of the United States Army Chemical Corps having served in Desert Storm; her second brother, Charan, is a web designer.

At age 12, Haley began helping with the bookkeeping in her mother's ladies' clothing shop, Exotica International. In 1989, she graduated from the private Orangeburg Preparatory Schools.  She graduated from Clemson University in 1994 with a bachelor's degree in accounting.

First decade after college (1995–2004)
After graduating from college, Haley worked for FCR Corporation, a waste management and recycling company, before joining her family's clothing business as its bookkeeper and chief financial officer.

She married Michael Haley in 1996. She later became active in civic affairs. In 1998, she was named to the board of directors of the Orangeburg County Chamber of Commerce. She was named to the board of directors of the Lexington Chamber of Commerce in 2003. Haley became treasurer of the National Association of Women Business Owners in 2003, and president in 2004.

Haley chaired the Lexington Gala to raise funds for a local hospital. She also served on the Lexington Medical Foundation, Lexington County Sheriff's Foundation, and West Metro Republican Women. She was the president of the South Carolina Chapter of the National Association of Women Business Owners, and was chair for the 2006 Friends of Scouting Leadership Division campaign.

South Carolina House of Representatives (2005–2011)

Election and re-election
In 2004, Haley ran for the South Carolina House of Representatives to represent District 87 in Lexington County. She challenged incumbent state representative Larry Koon in the Republican primary. He was the longest-serving legislator in the South Carolina Statehouse. Her platform included property tax relief and education reform. 

In the primary election, she forced a runoff as Koon did not win a majority but rather 42% of the vote, while she placed second with 40% of the vote. In the runoff, she defeated him 55–45%. She ran unopposed in the general election. 

Haley became the first Indian-American to hold office in South Carolina. She was unopposed for re-election to a second term in 2006. In 2008, she won re-election to a third term, defeating Democrat Edgar Gomez 83–17%.

In 2012, Haley would credit Hillary Clinton with inspiring her to run for office, stating in an interview that:"The reason I actually ran for office is because of Hillary Clinton... She said that when it comes to women running for office, there will be everybody that tells you why you shouldn't, but that's all the reasons why we need you to do it, and I walked out of there thinking, 'That's it. I'm running for office.

Legislative tenure and policies

Haley was elected chair of the freshman caucus in 2005 and majority whip in the South Carolina General Assembly. She was the only freshman legislator named to a whip spot at the time.

One of Haley's stated goals was to lower taxes. When Mark Sanford was governor of South Carolina, Haley voted against a proposed cigarette surtax despite criticism that the revenue from the tax would have been used for smoking prevention programs and cancer research related to smoking. She voted for a bill that raised sales taxes from five cents per dollar to six cents per dollar. The bill exempted sales tax on unprepared food such as canned goods. The same bill also exempts property tax on "owner-occupied residential property" except for the taxes due from what is still owed on the property.

Haley implemented a plan in which teachers' salaries would be based on not only seniority and qualifications but also job performance, as determined by evaluations and reports from principals, students, and parents. She supports school choice and charter schools.

Haley supports barring legislators from collecting legislative pensions while in office. She believes such pensions should be based on only the $10,400 legislative salary instead of the salary plus lawmakers' $12,000 annual expense allowance.

Haley has stated that, as a daughter of immigrants, she believes the immigration laws should be enforced. She voted in favor of a law that requires employers to be able to prove that newly hired employees are legal residents of the United States, and also requires all immigrants to carry documentation at all times proving that they are legally in the United States. Haley signed an "Arizona-style" law cracking down on illegal immigration in June 2011. The law is the subject of a lawsuit initiated by the United States Justice Department on numerous grounds, including claims the immigration law violates the Supremacy Clause. Rob Godfrey, a spokesman for Haley, said, "If the feds were doing their job, we wouldn't have had to address illegal immigration reform at the state level. But, until they do, we're going to keep fighting in South Carolina to be able to enforce our laws."

Haley describes herself as pro-life and has supported legislation to restrict abortion. She has stated "I'm not pro-life because the Republican Party tells me, I'm pro-life because all of us have had experiences of what it means to have one of these special little ones in our life." In 2016, she re-signed a new state law that bans abortions at 20 weeks of pregnancy.

Haley has voted in favor of some bills relating to abortion that were tabled or rejected, including the Inclusion of Unborn Child/Fetus in Definition for Civil Suits Amendment, Prohibiting Employment Termination Due to Abortion Waiting Period amendment, and Exempting Cases of Rape from Abortion Waiting Period amendment. The latter would have allowed specific cases of women to not have to wait the mandatory 24 hours before having an abortion.

As a state legislator, her assignments included the Committee on Labor, Commerce and Industry, and the Committee on Medical, Military, Public and Municipal Affairs.  She had several caucus memberships as well, including the Freshman Caucus, 2005–2006 (chair), the Sportsman's Caucus, and the Women's Caucus, 2007 (Vice Chair)  She also served on the Lexington County Meth Taskforce.

Governor of South Carolina (2011–2017)

2010 gubernatorial election

On May 14, 2009, Haley announced that she would run for the Republican nomination for governor of South Carolina in the 2010 elections. Haley had been persuaded to run by incumbent governor and fellow Republican Mark Sanford. On November 11, 2009, she was endorsed by former Massachusetts governor and GOP presidential candidate Mitt Romney, as well as Jenny Sanford, the incumbent first lady of South Carolina. Haley has old ties to the Chicago businessman and the Republican Hindu Coalition founder Shalabh "Shalli" Kumar. Kumar reminisced in a 2016 interview, "Her father Ajit Singh Randhawa approached me in the summer of 2010 to support his daughter's campaign to run for governor of South Carolina." He became her largest donor. She was polling in last place in the GOP race before a surprise endorsement from former Alaska governor Sarah Palin, three weeks before the primary vote.

The Republican gubernatorial primary took place on June 8, 2010, and Haley captured 49% of the vote, forcing a runoff election on June 22. Haley won handily in the runoff vote.

Haley was elected governor on November 2, 2010, defeating the Democratic candidate, Vincent Sheheen 51% to 47%. She is considered the third non-white governor elected by a Southern state, after Virginia's Douglas Wilder and Louisiana's Bobby Jindal.

2014 re-election

On August 12, 2013, Haley announced she would seek a second term as governor. She faced a challenge in the Republican primary from Tom Ervin. However, Ervin withdrew and later re-entered the 2014 gubernatorial campaign as an independent.

As in 2010, Vincent Sheheen of the Democratic Party ran against Haley. Republican-turned-Independent Tom Ervin was also running in the early stages of the contest, as were Libertarian Steve French and United Citizens Party candidate Morgan Bruce Reeves. 

The first public debate was held in Charleston on October 14 between French, Ervin, Haley, Reeves, and Sheheen. The second public debate in Greenville on October 21 again included all five candidates. A week after the second debate, Ervin withdrew from the race and endorsed Sheheen.

Haley was re-elected on November 4, 2014, with a 55.9 percent to 41.3 percent win, almost tripling her margin of victory over Sheheen in the 2010 gubernatorial election.

Tenure
Haley began serving as governor of South Carolina in January 2011. In 2012, former governor Mitt Romney considered her for his vice-presidential running mate. In April 2012, Haley said that she would turn down any potential vice presidential offer: "I'd say thank you, but no, I made a promise to the people of this state. And I think that promise matters. And I intend to keep it."

During her second term, Haley feuded with veteran lawmakers in the General Assembly. She endorsed powerful senate finance chairman Hugh Leatherman's primary opponent in 2016. After winning the primary, Leatherman stated that Haley was not just a lame duck, but a "dead duck." Her second term as governor was set to expire on January 9, 2019; however, Haley resigned her position on January 24, 2017, to serve as U.S. ambassador to the United Nations.

Haley delivered the official Republican response to President Barack Obama's 2016 State of the Union Address on January 12, 2016.

In 2016, Haley was named by Time magazine as one of the 100 most influential people in the world.  

Haley was mentioned in January 2016 as a potential candidate for the vice presidency in the 2016 U.S. presidential election. The Economist described Haley as a politician with high approval ratings who possesses a combination of "fiscal ferocity and a capacity for conciliation," and stated as a female candidate and ethnic minority she would have appeal. On May 4, 2016, after Trump became the presumptive presidential nominee, Haley denied interest in the vice presidential nomination.

Four lieutenant governors served under Haley. Haley, a Republican, welcomed Yancey McGill, a Democrat, to serve as her lieutenant governor after Glenn F. McConnell's resignation. Haley was initially against having a Democrat serve as the second-in-command to the governor, but she, along with the Senate, eventually agreed otherwise.

On December 17, 2012, Haley announced she would appoint Tim Scott to replace retiring Senator Jim DeMint, who had previously announced that he would retire from the Senate to become the president of the Heritage Foundation. Following his appointment, Scott became the first African American U.S. senator from South Carolina.

News media reported that Scott, Representative Trey Gowdy, former South Carolina attorney general Henry McMaster, former First Lady of South Carolina Jenny Sanford, and South Carolina Department of Health and Environmental Control Director Catherine Templeton were on Haley's short list to replace DeMint. Of choosing Scott, Haley said, "It is important to me, as a minority female, that Congressman Scott earned this seat, he earned this seat for the person that he is. He earned this seat with the results he has shown."

In July 2013, Haley was fined $3,500 by the State Ethics Commission and given a "public warning" for failing to report the addresses of eight donors during her 2010 campaign for governor.

In August 2013, Haley signed an extradition order for Dusten Brown to be brought to South Carolina in the Adoptive Couple v. Baby Girl case.

Gubernatorial policies

Upon becoming governor, Haley appointed Bobby Hitt as the state's secretary of commerce. She stated of the economy: "We have announced 85,613 jobs. We have celebrated 672 projects—more than half of which were expansions...We have seen $21.5 billion in capital investment. Our unemployment rate is now 4.4 percent. Every single one of our 46 counties has seen new jobs. Every one."In inviting business to move to South Carolina, she has said:

Before June 2015, Haley supported flying the Confederate flag on the statehouse grounds. In the immediate aftermath of the Charleston church shooting, Haley did not take a position on removing the flag, saying, "I think the state will start talking about that again, and we'll see where it goes." On June 22, Haley called for the removal of the Confederate flag from the statehouse grounds. She stated:

"These grounds [the State Capital] are a place that everybody should feel a part of. What I realized now more than ever is people were driving by and felt hurt and pain. No one should feel pain." Haley also said, "There is a place for that flag," but she added, "It's not in a place that represents all people in South Carolina."

In July 2015, Haley signed a bill to authorize removing the Confederate flag from the flagpole on the grounds of the South Carolina Capitol. In December 2019, she defended the people of South Carolina, saying that "some people" in South Carolina saw the flag as a representation of "service and sacrifice and heritage" before the flag was hijacked by the white supremacist mass killer Dylann Roof.In regard to the state trial of Roof, Haley urged prosecutors to seek the death penalty against him.

In April 2016, Haley indicated she would not support legislation introduced by the South Carolina State Senate that would require transgender individuals to use restrooms based on their gender assigned at birth. Haley stated:

These are not instances that... y'all haven't reported on anything. I haven't heard anything that's come to my office. So when I look at South Carolina, we look at our situations, we're not hearing of anybody's religious liberties that are being violated, and we're, again, not hearing any citizens that feel like they are being violated in terms of freedoms.

Haley described such restroom legislation as unnecessary.

In 2021, Haley spoke against Executive Order 13988, officially titled Preventing and Combating Discrimination on the Basis of Gender Identity or Sexual Orientation.

Haley has been described by South Carolina senator Lindsey Graham as a "strong supporter of the State of Israel." As governor of South Carolina, she signed into law a bill to stop efforts of the Boycott, Divestment and Sanctions (BDS) movement. This legislation was the first of its kind on a statewide level. Haley also stated that "nowhere has the UN's failure been more consistent and more outrageous than in its bias against our close ally Israel".

Haley supports Voter ID laws, laws requiring photo identification at the polls.  Haley’s spokesman said, “Those who see race in this issue are those who see race in every issue, but anyone looking at this law honestly will understand it is a commonsense measure to protect our voting process. Nothing more, nothing less.”

Veto record
During her 2011–2017 gubernatorial term, Haley vetoed 50 bills, 24 (48%) of which were overridden by the state legislature.

United States ambassador to the United Nations (2017–2018)

Nomination and confirmation

On November 23, 2016, then President-elect Donald Trump announced his intention to nominate Haley for ambassador to the United Nations. On January 20, 2017, President Trump sent Haley's nomination to the United States Senate. It has been reported that Trump considered Haley for the position of secretary of state, which she declined.

On January 24, 2017, by a vote of 96–4, Haley was confirmed by the Senate to become U.S. ambassador to the United Nations. The four senators who voted against Haley were Bernie Sanders (I-Vt.), Martin Heinrich (D-N.M.), Tom Udall (D-N.M.), and Chris Coons (D-Del.) Haley was the first Indian American to hold a cabinet level position. Shortly thereafter, she resigned as South Carolina governor, and Lt. Governor Henry McMaster ascended to the governorship of South Carolina.

Haley was sworn in by Vice President Mike Pence on January 25, 2017. She met with United Nations secretary-general António Guterres on January 27, 2017, at the UN Headquarters in New York City. She replaced Ambassador Samantha Power.

Ambassadorial tenure and positions
On February 2, 2017, Haley declared to the U.N. Security Council that sanctions against Russia for its Crimean conflict would not be lifted until Russia returned control over the region to Ukraine. On June 4, Haley reported the United States would retain "sanctions strong and tough when it comes to the issue in Ukraine".

On March 15, 2017, Haley said she would not support a ban on Muslim immigration to the United States should President Trump choose to enact one. Haley said she did not believe "we should ever ban anyone based on their religion" and that a Muslim ban would be "un-American".

On March 30, 2017, Haley stated that the U.S. would no longer focus on forcing Syrian president Bashar al-Assad to leave power. This was a policy shift from former president Barack Obama's initial stance on Assad. On April 5, speaking to the U.N. Security Council a day after the Khan Shaykhun chemical attack, Haley said Russia, Assad, and Iran "have no interest in peace" and attacks similar to this would continue occurring should nothing be done in response. A day later, the U.S. launched 59 Tomahawk cruise missiles toward the Shayrat Air Base in Syria. Haley called the strike a "very measured step" and warned that the U.S. was prepared "to do more" despite wishing it would not be required. On April 12, after Russia blocked a draft resolution meant to condemn the Khan Shaykhun chemical attack, Haley criticized Russia, saying "We need to see Russia choose to side with the civilized world over an Assad government that brutally terrorizes its own people." June 28, while appearing before the United States House Committee on Foreign Affairs, Haley credited President Trump's warning to Syria with stopping another chemical attack: "I can tell you due to the president's actions, we did not see an incident."

In April 2017, while holding her first session as president of the UN Security Council, Haley charged Iran and Hezbollah with having "conducted terrorist acts" for decades within the Middle East.

Haley said the U.S. military could be deployed in response to any further North Korean missile tests or usage of nuclear missiles and that she believed Kim Jong-un understood this due to pressure by both the U.S. and China. On May 14, 2017, after North Korea performed a ballistic missile test, Haley said Kim was "in a state of paranoia" after feeling pressure from the U.S. On June 2, 2017, after the U.N. Security Council approved a resolution adding fifteen North Koreans and four entities linked to North Korea's nuclear and missile programs to a sanctions blacklist, Haley said the council's vote was "sending a clear message to North Korea today: Stop firing ballistic missiles or face the consequences". On July 5, 2017, during a U.N. Security Council meeting, in response to North Korea launching an intercontinental ballistic missile, Haley announced the US would within days "bring before the Security Council a resolution that raises the international response in a way that is proportionate to North Korea's new escalation". The following month the U.N. Security Council unanimously approved sanctions on North Korea banning exports worth over $1 billion. Haley said that the sanctions package was "the single largest ... ever leveled against the North Korean regime".

Also in April 2017, Haley spoke out against Ramzan Kadyrov and the abuse and murder of gay men in Chechnya. She stated that "We continue to be disturbed by reports of kidnapping, torture, and murder of people in Chechnya based on their sexual orientation ... this violation of human rights cannot be ignored".

In a May 2017 interview, Haley expressed interest in moving the U.S. embassy to Israel from Tel Aviv to Jerusalem. On June 7, Haley charged the U.N. with having "bullied Israel for a very long time" and pledged the US would end this treatment while in Jerusalem. Israel occupied the Jordan-controlled East Jerusalem during the Six-Day War in 1967 and formally annexed it in 1980. The Jerusalem Law declared Jerusalem to be Israel's "undivided capital".

In July 2017, after the UNESCO voted to designate the Hebron's Old City and the Cave of the Patriarchs as Palestinian territory as well as endangered world heritage sites, Haley called the choice "tragic on several levels" in a statement (see Israeli–Palestinian conflict in Hebron).

In September 2017, Haley stated that "some countries" (a reference to Russia, although Haley did not refer to Russia by name) were shielding Iran by blocking the International Atomic Energy Agency from verifying Iranian compliance with the international nuclear agreement with Iran. Haley said that it "appears that some countries are attempting to shield Iran from even more inspections. Without inspections, the Iran deal is an empty promise."

In September 2017, Haley said that her government was "deeply troubled" by reports of atrocities against Rohingya Muslims in Myanmar. Haley criticized Myanmar's civilian leader Aung San Suu Kyi for "justifying the imprisonment of the two Reuters reporters who reported on the ethnic cleansing."

In October 2017, the federal Office of Special Counsel determined that Haley had violated the federal Hatch Act in June 2017 by re-tweeting Trump's endorsement of Ralph Norman, a Republican candidate for Congress in South Carolina. Haley deleted the re-tweet after a complaint was filed by the government watchdog group Citizens for Responsibility and Ethics in Washington. The Office of Special Counsel issued a reprimand by letter but did not recommend any further action be taken against Haley. The special counsel's letter warned Haley that any future violation could be considered "a willful and knowing violation of the law".

In October 2017, the U.S., along with 13 other nations, voted against a U.N. resolution titled "The Question of the Death Penalty", which condemned the use of capital punishment when "applied arbitrarily or in a discriminatory manner" and specifically condemned "the imposition of the death penalty as a sanction for specific forms of conduct, such as apostasy, blasphemy, adultery and consensual same-sex relations." LGBTQ rights advocates in the U.S., including the Human Rights Campaign, were critical of the vote. After the vote, a State Department spokeswoman announced that "We voted against that resolution because of broader concerns with the resolution's approach in condemning the death penalty in all circumstances ... The United States unequivocally condemns the application of the death penalty for conduct such as homosexuality, blasphemy, adultery, and apostasy. We do not consider such conduct appropriate for criminalization."

Egypt sponsored a Security Council resolution voiding any unilateral decisions on Jerusalem's status. The resolution further demanded that countries "refrain from the establishment of diplomatic missions in the holy city." In December 2017, Haley warned UN members that she would be "taking names" of countries that voted to reject President Trump's decision to recognize Jerusalem as the capital of Israel and move the U.S. embassy there from Tel Aviv. In a letter, Haley wrote: "As you consider your vote, I encourage you to know the president and the US take this vote personally. The president will be watching this vote carefully and has requested I report back on those who voted against us." The resolution still passed by an overwhelming margin: 128 in favour, 35 abstaining and only nine against. Haley even travelled to some countries that voted "No," such as Guatemala and Honduras, and thanked them for their support in the emergency special session.

Also in December 2017, Haley accused Iran of backing the Houthi rebels in Yemen. The Houthis were fighting the Saudi-backed Hadi government. She said that the "fight against Iranian aggression is the world's fight." Iranian U.N. mission spokesman Alireza Miryusefi said in response that "These accusations seek also to cover up for the Saudi war crimes in Yemen, with the US complicity, and divert attention from the stalemate war of aggression against the Yemenis." Iran likened Haley's presentation to that of then-Secretary of State Colin Powell, before the 2003 invasion of Iraq. Haley also said that "It's hard to find a conflict or terrorist group in the Middle East that doesn't have Iran's fingerprints all over it", but she did not mention the U.S. role in Saudi-led intervention in Yemen and Saudi-led coalition's blockade of Yemen.

In December 2017, Haley said that the women who had accused President Trump of touching or groping them without their consent "should be heard."

In January 2018, she supported President Trump's withholding aid to Palestinians through the U.N. Relief and Works Agency (UNRWA).

In April 2018, she failed to disclose to both President Trump and the American people that several US Military members deployed in support of the United Nations Multidimensional Integrated Stabilization Mission in Mali (MINUSMA) were wounded in a large complex attack in Timbuktu.

On 19 June 2018, Haley and U.S. Secretary of State Mike Pompeo announced that the U.S. was pulling out of the United Nations Human Rights Council, accusing the council of being "hypocritical and self-serving"; in the past, Haley had accused it of "chronic anti-Israel bias". "When the Human Rights Council treats Israel worse than North Korea, Iran, and Syria, it is the Council itself that is foolish and unworthy of its name. It is time for the countries who know better to demand changes," Haley said in a statement at the time, pointing to the council's adoption of five resolutions condemning Israel.

On October 9, 2018, she tendered her resignation as the U.N. ambassador, which President Donald Trump accepted. Haley's resignation emerged a day after an anti-corruption watchdog accused her of accepting seven luxury private plane trips as gifts from South Carolina business leaders. The watchdog group, Citizens for Responsibility and Ethics in Washington (CREW), was the first to break this story after requesting an Inspector General investigation. Haley listed these seven flights as gifts on a 2018 financial disclosure, claiming that they are exempt from ethics violations as they were gifted by personal contacts. A spokesperson for CREW said they have no reason to believe that this was related to her resignation as ambassador.

In October 2018, Haley raised the issue of China's re-education camps and human rights abuses against the Uyghur Muslim minority. She said that "At least a million Uighurs and other Muslim minorities have been imprisoned in so-called 're-education camps' in western China," and detainees are "tortured … forced to renounce their religion and to pledge allegiance to the Communist Party."

Haley left her position as U.N. ambassador on December 31, 2018. She was succeeded as U.S. Ambassador to the UN by Ambassador Kelly Craft.

Post–United Nations interlude (2019–2022)
In 2019, Haley created a new policy group called Stand for America, a group that promotes public policies aimed at strengthening the economy, culture, and national security issues. Several billionaires and hedge fund managers have made large donations to the group.

In February 2019, it was announced that Haley had been nominated to the board of directors of Boeing. She was elected at the annual shareholder meeting on April 29. Critics have alleged that the position at Boeing may have been offered to Haley due to favorable official actions she took with regard to Boeing while in office in South Carolina. Boeing board members earn "a minimum annual compensation of $315,000 as of 2017, the most recent figures available in a regulatory filing." On March 19, 2020, Haley stepped down from the Board of Directors stating her disagreement with the board over a government bailout during the global coronavirus crisis.

Circa 2019 it was rumored that President Trump sought to replace Vice President Mike Pence for Nikki Haley as his running mate in the 2020 U.S. presidential election. It was assumed that putting Haley on Trump's 2020 ticket could help his performance with suburban women, a demographic he had so far struggled to mobilize in his favor. However, Trump promptly denied these speculations saying "I love Nikki and there are places for Nikki, and Nikki's future is great, but Mike Pence is the person, 100%. We won together. We have tremendous evangelical support. You can't break up a team like that." Haley also dismissed that allegation on Twitter "Enough of the false rumors. Vice President Pence has been a dear friend of mine for years. He has been a loyal and trustworthy VP to the President. He has my complete support."

She supported Trump's January 2020 killing of Iranian general Qasem Soleimani. Haley stated on Fox News and later tweeted that Democrats were "mourning the loss of Soleimani."

In early 2021, Haley created a PAC to endorse and support candidates in the 2022 midterm elections. She hired former NRSC political director Betsy Ankney to be the executive director.

In October 2021, Haley was selected to replace David Wilkins for a lifetime position on the Clemson University Board of Trustees.

Relationship with Donald Trump 
During the 2016 Republican presidential primaries Haley supported and campaigned for Senator Marco Rubio.  Haley also received extensive press coverage for saying the phrase "bless your heart" in response to an attack by then-presidential candidate Donald Trump. Trump had attacked her on Twitter for her call for him to release his tax records.

Haley was critical of Trump during the election, and was a supporter of Florida Senator Marco Rubio. She stated of Trump in 2016: "I will not stop until we fight a man that chooses not to disavow the KKK. That is not a part of our party. That's not who we want as president. We will not allow that in our country."When Rubio dropped out of the election, she then supported candidate Ted Cruz. When Trump became the Republican finalist, she said that she would vote for him, but was "not a fan."  

In October 2016, when asked if she'd vote for Trump she replied, "Of course". Haley further endorsed Trump saying, "...the best person based on the policies, and dealing with things like Obamacare, still is Donald Trump". Haley warned that Trump's rhetoric could lead to violent tragedy.

Since her resignation as UN ambassador in 2018, she has remained supportive of Trump and his administration describing him as a "friend". She has stated that she was "proud of the successes of the administration" and "I'm not going to apologize" for working with Trump. She defended Trump since his election loss against Joe Biden saying, "I understand the president. I understand that genuinely, to his core, he believes he was wronged, this is not him making it up."

She described Trump's actions around the 2021 storming of the United States Capitol as "not his finest", but opposed Trump's second impeachment, criticizing Democrats and journalists on Fox News's The Ingraham Angle with Laura Ingraham. In that January 25 television interview, she also declared that she would vote against impeachment, and that "They will bring about impeachment, yet they say they are for unity. They beat him up before he got into office. They are beating him up after he leaves office. At some point, give the man a break. I mean, move on". However, in an interview given on January 12, 2021, but published a month later, while Trump's second impeachment trial was underway on charges he had incited the January 2021 storming of the Capitol, Haley said, "We need to acknowledge he let us down. He went down a path he shouldn't have, and we shouldn't have followed him, and we shouldn't have listened to him. And we can't let that ever happen again." According to Politico in February 2021, 

Haley reportedly later reached out to former President Trump to request a sit-down meeting at Mar-a-Lago. Trump reportedly declined the request.

When asked whether Trump is a friend, she stated that "Friend is a loose term." She has been critical of Trump's role during the 2021 storming of the United States Capitol, saying that she was angry that Donald Trump took no action to protect Vice President Pence, adding, "When I tell you I'm angry, it's an understatement."

In February 2021 Haley stated: 

Nevertheless, in April 2021, Haley said she would support Trump for president in 2024.

During the next years, "after being plucked from the governorship of South Carolina to serve as U.S. ambassador to the United Nations, Haley had navigated the Trump era with a singular shrewdness," Tim Alberta argues, citing a New York Times editorial claiming that Haley was able to "exit the administration with her dignity largely intact."

Presidential campaign (2023–present)

While speaking at Christians United for Israel's Washington summit in July 2022, Haley hinted at a run for president in the 2024 U.S. presidential election, saying, "If this president signs any sort of [Iran nuclear] deal, I'll make you a promise: The next president will shred it on her first day in office," and, "Just saying, sometimes it takes a woman." On February 1, 2023, it was reported that Haley was going to announce a bid for the presidency on February 15, making her the first challenger to former President Donald Trump's campaign. Haley will be the third Indian American politician to seek a presidential nomination following Bobby Jindal and Vice President Kamala Harris. Haley had previously claimed that she would not run for the candidacy if Trump also sought the nomination.

On February 14, 2023, she officially announced her candidacy. In an ad titled "Strong and Proud," Haley made it official that she is running for president in 2024. She became the second major candidate to announce her run for the 2024 Republican presidential primaries. Haley is the first woman of color to be a major candidate for the Republican presidential nomination, though she is not the first such non-major candidate (e.g. see Isabell Masters). She is the first woman who has been a governor to run for president.

On February 15, 2023, Haley held a campaign announcement rally with supporters in Charleston, South Carolina and received an endorsement from freedom caucus member Ralph Norman, with him saying that she would have been in the group of Congressional Republicans opposing Speaker Kevin McCarthy. She also was joined by the mother of Otto Warmbier who praised Haley for changing her life following her son's death. Haley also announced that she supports congressional term limits and "mandatory mental competence tests for politicians over 75 years old," which received mixed feedback from U.S. Senators. 

The efficacy of Haley's campaign is debated among experts and commentators. The Wall Street Journal's Editorial Board wrote that there is “no clear rationale for her candidacy.” Political columnists at the New York Times say the two-year governor and former US ambassador to the United Nations should not be taken seriously. "Nikki Haley Will Not Be the Next President," read the caption. However, Politico's Chief Washington Correspondent, Ryan Lizza, wrote that Haley "shouldn't be counted out just yet" due to her relative youth, the tradition of volatility and upsets in republican primaries, and her electability. Likewise, Former Lieutenant Governor of Georgia Geoff Duncan wrote that Nikki Haley's candidacy "is a race to watch" while citing her prior executive and foreign policy experience, along with her prior record of supporting popular conservative bills and policies while in office.

Positions and policies during presidential campaign
In addition to positions and policies articulated earlier in her career, Haley has taken further stances during her campaign for the U.S. presidency. Haley addressed the issue of abortion as far back as her service in the South Carolina state legislature. In a 2023 interview, she elaborated on that subject, pointing to a proposal from Senator Lindsey Graham that would establish a national 15-week abortion ban, with exceptions for rape, incest, health, and life of the mother.

Haley said that the Florida Parental Rights in Education Act, known as the "Don't Say Gay" law, does not go far enough, in that prohibitions against discussing sex and sexuality before third grade should be subject to opt-in parental consent, and suggesting they should be extended until seventh grade."

In an opinion article published by the New York Post on 24 February 2023, Haley vowed to "cut every cent in foreign aid for countries that hate [the United States]". She listed Iraq, Pakistan, Zimbabwe, China, and Cuba as such countries, and labeled them enemies of the United States.

Personal life

In September 1996, Nikki Randhawa married Michael Haley; they celebrated with both Sikh and Methodist ceremonies. The couple have two children, a daughter and a son.

Haley converted to Christianity in 1997. She and her husband regularly attend the United Methodist Church. She also attends Sikh services once or twice a year. She visited the Harmandir Sahib with her husband in 2014 during her visit to India. During a Christianity Today interview, when asked whether or not she hopes her parents convert to Christianity, Haley responded, "What I hope is that my parents do what's right for them."

Her husband is an officer in the South Carolina Army National Guard. During her gubernatorial term, he was sent in January 2013 on a year-long deployment to Afghanistan.

Haley and her family reside in Kiawah Island, South Carolina near the city of Charleston.

Books
 Can't Is Not an Option: My American Story, Sentinel, New York (2012).
 With All Due Respect: Defending America with Grit and Grace, St. Martin's Press, New York (2019).
 A Better Blueprint for International Organizations: Advancing American Interests on the Global Stage, Foundation for Defense of Democracies, (2021)
 If You Want Something Done: Leadership Lessons from Bold Women, St. Martin's Press, New York (2022).

Awards and honors
 Friend of the Taxpayer Award, S.C. Association of Taxpayers, 2005
 Leader in Liberty Award, ABATE of South Carolina, 2005
 Legislator of the Year Award, Centennial Foundation, 2005
 Indian American Pride Award, Indian American Friendship Council, 2005
 Palmetto Leadership Award, South Carolina Policy Council, 2006
 Strom Thurmond Excellence in Public Service and Government Award, South Carolina Federation of Republican Women, 2006
 Champion of Housing Award, Home Builders Association of S.C., 2007
 W. Mack Chamblee Quality of Life Award, S.C. Association of Realtors, 2007
 Order of the Palmetto, 2010
 India Abroad Person of the Year 2010, India Abroad, 2011
 State Leadership Award, Motor & Equipment Manufacturers Association, 2013
 Roger Milliken Defender Of Manufacturing Award, South Carolina Manufacturers Alliance, Dec 5, 2013
 Honorary Doctorate of Public Service, University of South Carolina, May 8, 2015
 Ambassador of the Year, Columbia Chamber, 2015.
 Award of Appreciation, Harvard Foundation for Intercultural and Race Relations, 2015
 David H. Wilkins Awards for Excellence, The Riley Institute at Furman University, 2015
 First Lady's Visionary Award, Claflin University, 2016
 "The 100 Most Influential People", Time, 2016
 Hyman Rubin Award, Greater Columbia Community Relations Council, 2016
 WDN "10 for 10" award, International Republican Institute, 2016
 Global Vision Award, Columbia World Affairs Council, 2016
 The World's 100 Most Powerful Women, Forbes, 2017
 The 25 Most Powerful Female Political Leaders, Forbes, 2017
 Honorary Doctorate of Humanities, Clemson University, May 10, 2018
 Freedom award, International Republican Institute, 2018
 Defender of Israel, Christians United for Israel, July 23, 2018
 FDD's Jeane J. Kirkpatrick Statesmanship Award, Foundation for Defense of Democracies 2018
 Global Leadership Award Hudson Institute 2018
 Barbara K. Olson Woman of Valor Award, Independent Women's Forum,2018
 Excellence in Diplomacy Award, B'nai B'rith International, 2018
 Citizen of the Carolinas Award, 2018
 Ralph Hauenstein Fellowship Award, Hauenstein Center for Presidential Studies, 2019
 Friend of Israel Humanitarian Award, Miami Jewish Federation, 2019
 JCCM King David Award 11 April 2019
 UN Watch's Eleanor Roosevelt Award, UN Watch 2019
 Humanitarian Laureate Award, The Simon Wiesenthal Center, May 24, 2019
 Irving Kristol Award American Enterprise Institute 2019
 World Jewish Congress Theodor Herzl Award, 6 November 2019
 Woman of Courage, College of Charleston's School of Business Award, February 27, 2020
 SOTE Award finalist – delayed ceremony due to COVID-19 pandemic.

Electoral history

See also

 Indian Americans in New York City
 List of female governors in the United States
 List of governors of South Carolina
 List of minority governors and lieutenant governors in the United States

References

External links

 
 Announcement of presidential candidacy, via Twitter video, 14 Feb. 2023
 
 

|-

|-

|-

|-

|-

|-

 
1972 births
21st-century American politicians
21st-century American women politicians
American accountants
Women accountants
American people of Punjabi descent
American politicians of Indian descent
American state governors of Indian descent
American women ambassadors
Ambassadors of the United States
Asian-American people in South Carolina politics
Asian-American members of the Cabinet of the United States
Clemson University alumni
Converts to Christianity from Sikhism
Republican Party governors of South Carolina
Living people
Republican Party members of the South Carolina House of Representatives
People from Bamberg, South Carolina
People from Lexington, South Carolina
Permanent Representatives of the United States to the United Nations
Trump administration cabinet members
Women members of the Cabinet of the United States
Women state governors of the United States
Women state legislators in South Carolina
Asian conservatism in the United States
Candidates in the 2024 United States presidential election
Christians from South Carolina